William Wingfield (later William Wingfield-Baker) KC, MP (1772 – 21 March 1858), was an attorney, judge, and Member of Parliament in 19th century England.

Early years
Born in Mickleham, Surrey, England, William was the second son of George Wingfield (died May 1774) of Mickleham. His mother, Mary, was the niece of George Sparrow.

William's brother, George Wingfield, Lord of Akeld, later took the surname Sparrow to comply with the will of a great uncle.  The other siblings included three sisters:  
Anne (married Rev. Thomas Henry Hume, Canon of Salisbury, in 1793), 
Elizabeth (married John James in 1797),
and Mary (married John Basset in 1790).

William's paternal grandfather, also named William Wingfield, owned property in Cleadon.

He entered Christ Church, Oxford in 1789, and received a B.A. degree in 1792. He was admitted to Lincoln's Inn in 1792 and called to the bar at Lincoln's Inn five years later.  His early practise was as an equity draftsman, in all likelihood because of the Inn's historical association with the Court of Chancery.

Career
Wingfield served for a short time as a member of parliament for Bodmin during the period of 1806 to 1807 alongside Davies Gilbert. In 1818, he became a Bencher, and was appointed King's Counsel.  Eight years later, he was a proprietor (one of 700) of the Russell Institution, a school of literature and science in Victorian London. Wingfield became Chief Justice of the Brecon Circuit. He was appointed  Master in Chancery in 1824 upon the death of Sir John Simeon, 1st Baronet.

He held several positions within the Honorable Society of Lincoln's Inn including Master of the Walks in 1824, Keeper of the Black Book in 1825, Dean of the Chapel in 1827, and Treasurer in 1828.

He was a Trustee of the Law Fire Insurance Society.

Personal life

In 1796, he married Lady Charlotte-Maria (died 1807), eldest daughter of Henry Digby, 1st Earl Digby by whom he had several children, including:  
George Digby (who succeeded to the estates of the Earl Digby)
John Digby
Mary
Caroline (who married Charles Pepys, 1st Earl of Cottenham), 
Frances Eliza
Richard Baker Wingfield-Baker, an MP for South Essex

In 1813, he married Elizabeth, daughter of William Mills of Bitterne, Hampshire, a former East India Company director.  They had several children, including: 
Charles John Wingfield Member of Parliament for Gravesend, 
William Wriothesley Digby (Vicar of Gulval)
Frederick
Henry
Kenelm Digby
Julia
Lucy

He resided for a time at 29 Montague Street in London.

Wingfield legally changed his surname to Wingfield-Baker in 1849 by Royal licensure after his inheritance of Orsett Hall. The inheritance occurred by will when Richard Baker left his estate, Orsett Hall, to his brother's nephew by marriage to Lady St Aubyn (née Elizabeth Wingfield).

Wingfield died in 1859 at Sherborne Castle, the home of his eldest son, and is buried at Orsett.  A window inscribed in his honour was erected by his children at Gulval Church.

Thomas Creevey described Wingfield as 'the most successful humbug simpleton I have known all my life'.

References

1772 births
1858 deaths
Members of the Parliament of the United Kingdom for constituencies in Cornwall
UK MPs 1806–1807
19th-century English judges
Alumni of Christ Church, Oxford
People from Mickleham, Surrey
People from Orsett